Pablo Wilches (born 13 July 1955) is a Colombian former professional racing cyclist. He rode in three editions of the Tour de France, one edition of the Giro d'Italia and five editions of the Vuelta a España. In the 1987 Tour de France, Wilches was in 7th overall going into stage 20, but was unable to finish. He also won the Vuelta a Colombia the same year.

Major results

1982
 1st Stage 10 Vuelta a Colombia
1984
 6th Overall Vuelta a Colombia
1985
 5th Overall Critérium du Dauphiné Libéré
1986
 1st Stage 11 Vuelta a Colombia
1987
 1st  Overall Vuelta a Colombia
1st Stage 4 (ITT) 
 2nd Overall Clásico RCN
1st Stages 6 & 8 (ITT) 
1988
 1st Stage 9 Coors Classic
 3rd Overall Vuelta a Colombia
1st Stage 7
 3rd Overall Clásico RCN
1st Stage 1
1989
 3rd Overall Clásico RCN
1st Stage 6
 4th Overall Vuelta a Colombia
1st Stage 10
1991
 1st Stages 2 & 11 Vuelta a Colombia
 1st Prologue & Stages 4 (ITT) & 9 Clásico RCN

Grand Tour general classification results timeline

References

External links

1955 births
Living people
Colombian male cyclists
People from Cundinamarca Department
Vuelta a Colombia stage winners